Sanel is a given name for males and may refer to:

Sanel Borić (born 1987), American football (soccer) player
Sanel Jahić (born 1981), Bosnian football player
Sanel Kapidžić (born 1990), Bosnian football player
Sanel Kuljic (born 1977), Austrian football player

See also 
Hopland, California - formerly Sanel, California

Bosniak masculine given names
Bosnian masculine given names